Norah Mary Madeleine Lindsay (née Bourke) (26 April 1873 – 20 June 1948) was a socialite garden designer who between the World wars became a major influence on garden design and planting in the United Kingdom and on the Continent.

Biography 
Norah Mary Madeline Bourke was born at the hill station of Ootacamund, India into an Anglo-Irish upper class military family, the niece of the 6th Earl of Mayo, the Governor-General and Viceroy of India. At the age of 22 she married the brother of Violet Lindsay Manners, Sir Harry Lindsay and went to live at her wedding gift, Sutton Courtenay Manor, Oxfordshire, actually an assemblage of charming and picturesque houses and cottages, fine barns and stables, where she developed her skills as a gardener. Influenced by Gertrude Jekyll she created the noted garden at the house, with an inspired kind of untidiness that influenced her lifelong friend Vita Sackville-West's love of self-seeded surprise effects within a formal structure at Sissinghurst and that may be detected today in the garden style of Rosemary Verey. The writings of Gertrude Jekyll and the early champion of wild gardens William Robinson, she had no formal botanical training, but a highly developed 'garden sense' that was in part the inheritance of her class. In 1924 after the collapse of her marriage and facing financial ruin she embarked on a career as a garden designer. Lindsay spent her entire life socialising with the upper echelons of society. This led to many commissions from a client base which included royalty, English nobility and American expatriates.

Nancy Lancaster, the founder of the firm carried on by Sibyl Colefax and John Fowler, employed her at Ditchley Park and Kelmarsh Hall, and at the dozens of other country-house gardens she worked on, from Port Lympne, Kent, to Chirk Castle in North Wales. Lindsay collaborated with Christopher Hussey in two Country Life articles that illustrated Sutton Courtenay in its final, mature phase.

Nancy Lindsay (1896–1973) was the only daughter of Norah and Harry Lindsay and was greatly influenced by her mother's love of gardening. She formed a bond with her mother's good friend Maj. Lawrence 'Johnny' Johnston, the creator of Hidcote, that was based upon their common interest in plant collecting. After his death in 1958 Johnston left his French garden Serre de la Madone to Lindsay. She left a selection of her writings, paintings and plants to Oxford University. A small commemorative fund was established after her death to enable women to accompany plant-hunting expeditions led from the University. The legacy from her career is the many plants which bear her name which includes Dianthus Nancy Lindsay.

Gardens 

Listed below are a sample of gardens Lindsay influenced, advised, consulted and worked on

National Trust gardens;
Blickling Hall
Chirk Castle
Cliveden
Hidcote Manor
Mottisfont Abbey
Commercial and private gardens in the UK;
Cliveden Hotel
Ditchley Park
Faringdon Castle
Fort Belvedere
Gleneagles Hotel
Godmersham Park
Kelmarsh Hall
Mells Manor
Port Lympne
Rhodes House
Trent Park
Overseas;
Bled Castle
Brdo Castle
Serre de la Madone
Villa Madama

References

External links 
Norah Lindsay information
National Portrait Gallery, London  Portraits of Norah Lindsay
Country Life  11 October 2007 pp118–121.  "Gardener to the great and good" Allyson Hayward traces the remarkable life of Norah Lindsay  
List of commissions
Famous People linked with Sutton Courtenay – Norah Bourke Lindsay – Lived from 1904

1873 births
1948 deaths
Women horticulturists and gardeners
English socialites
People from Sutton Courtenay
British gardeners
Horticulturists